The Detroit Titans football program was a college football team that represents University of Detroit Mercy as an "independent" program and also in the Missouri Valley Conference, a part of the NCAA University Division.  The team has had 18 head coaches since its first recorded football game in 1891. The final coach was John Idzik who first took the position for the 1962 season and ended his duties at the end of the final season in 1964.

Key

Coaches
Statistics correct as of the end of the 1964 college football season, the last season of intercollegiate play (not counting club football).

Notes

References

Detroit Titans

Titans head football coaches
Detroit Titans football coaches